Brian Johnson (born 1947) is the lead singer of the Australian hard rock band AC/DC.

Brian or Bryan Johnson may also refer to:

Entertainment
Brian Johnson (special effects artist) (born 1939), film and TV special effects director
Brian D. Johnson, Canadian film critic and filmmaker
Brian Johnson, character in the television series My Parents Are Aliens
Brian Johnson, character in the film The Breakfast Club
Bryan Johnson (singer) (1926–1995), who placed second in the 1960 Eurovision Song Contest
B. S. Johnson (Bryan Stanley Johnson, 1933–1973), English poet, novelist and film-maker
Bryan Johnson (comic book writer) (born 1967), co-stars on Comic Book Men
Brian Johnson (Bethel Music singer) (born 1978), lead singer in Bethel Music and member of the duo Brian & Jenn Johnson
Brian Johnson (TV personality), better known as Chad Johnson, reality TV personality
Liver King, Internet personage of Brian Johnson, social media personality.

Sports

American football
Bryan Johnson (fullback) (born 1978), American NFL football player for the Washington Redskins and Chicago Bears
Brian Johnson (fullback) (born 1979), American NFL football player for the San Francisco 49ers
Brian Johnson (American football coach) (born 1987), American NFL football coach
Bryan Johnson (defensive end) (born 1988), American NFL football player for the Buffalo Bills and New York Jets
Brian Johnson (kicker) (born 1999), American NFL football placekicker

Association football (soccer)
Brian Johnson (footballer, born 1930) (1930–2013), English footballer
Brian Johnson (footballer, born 1948), English footballer for Tranmere Rovers
Brian Johnson (footballer, born 1955), English footballer
Brian Johnson (soccer) (born 1974), American soccer midfielder

Other sports
Brian Johnson (Australian footballer) (1932–2015), Australian rules footballer
Brian Johnson (rugby league) (1956–2016), Australian rugby league footballer and coach
Brian Johnson (ice hockey) (born 1960), Canadian ice hockey winger
Brian Johnson (catcher) (born 1968), American baseball player
Brian Johnson Jr. (born 1979), American stock car racing driver
Brian Johnson (long jumper) (born 1980), American long jumper
Bryan Johnson (motorcyclist) (born 1986), American supercross and motocross rider
Brian Johnson (curler) (fl. 1990s), Australian curler
Brian Johnson (pitcher) (born 1990), American baseball player
Brian Johnson (figure skater) (born 1995), American pair skater

Other
Brian K. Johnson, past president of Montgomery College
Brian F. G. Johnson (born 1938), British scientist and professor of chemistry
Brian Johnson (politician) (born 1961), Minnesota politician and member of the Minnesota House of Representatives
Bryan Johnson (entrepreneur) (born 1977), founder of Braintree, the credit card payments company

See also
Brian Johnston (disambiguation)
Evelyn Bryan Johnson (1909–2012), early female aircraft pilot